NZ Rail 150 was a celebration of 150 years of Rail transport in New Zealand, held in 2013, 150 years since the first public railway opened at Ferrymead in Christchurch.

The celebration was organised by KiwiRail in partnership with the Canterbury Railway Society, Ferrymead Heritage Park, and the Rail Heritage Trust of New Zealand.

Events
The celebrations commenced on 19 October with the Christchurch Model Train Show and carried on the next day. KiwiRail commenced their part in the celebrations on 29 September with their Exhibition Express that made the following stops:

 The Strand Station, Auckland – 29 September 2013

 Mt Maunganui, Tauranga – 5 October 2013
 Wellington railway station, Wellington – 12 October 2013
 Invercargill Railway Station, Invercargill – 17 October 2013
 Dunedin Railway Station, Dunedin – 19 October 2013
 Oamaru Railway Station, Oamaru – 21 October 2013
 Timaru Railway Station, Timaru – 23 October 2013
 Port of Lyttelton, Christchurch – 26 October 2013

The Mainline Steam Heritage Trust also commenced their part for the celebrations on the 19 with a steam excursion from Auckland to Northland hauled by JA 1275 and returned the next day. On the 21 they commenced JA 1240s delivery trip from Auckland with being towed by DL 9014 to Wellington with two days in Picton and then to Christchurch on the 24. Also during that day Silver Fern railcar RM 24 arrived in Christchurch from Dunedin.

The next day DG 772 from the Diesel Traction Group and DJ 1209 from the Dunedin Railways hauled an excursion from Christchurch to Kaikoura and return. On the 26 Ja 1240 hauled an excursion to Arthurs Pass and returned and the DG and DJ hauled an excursion to the Weka Pass Railway while the Canterbury Railway Society ran trains at the Ferrymead Heritage Park, with Mainline Steam's KA 942 and the Silver Fern railcar running trips between Ferrymead and Lyttelton. The Plains Vintage Railway & Historical Museum ran night runs with their locomotives A 64 and Oamaru Steam and Rail Restoration Societys B 10.

On the 27th Ferrymead held another open day, running their own and visiting locomotives while The Plains Railway were also running the A and B class locomotives. Then on the following day, JA 1240 headed to Timaru with the "Timaru Flyer". The Plains Railway again ran the B class locomotive and K 88. The Silver Fern railcar was running trips between Christchurch and Rolleston, and Christchurch and Rangiora. On the following day, Mainline Steam ran a four-day excursion from Christchurch to Greymouth and then to Westport the following day, and the next two days returning to Greymouth and Christchurch. During the 29th, the Silver Fern railcar ran a train from Christchurch to Springfield and return. It headed back to Dunedin the following day.

See also 
 Ferrymead 125 - similar event held in 1988

References

Further reading

External links 
 KiwiRail - 150 years of Rail
 Mainfreight - 150 years of rail in New Zealand

Rail transport in New Zealand
2013 in New Zealand